Apo Kardias (Greek: Από Καρδιάς; English: From the Heart) is the 1st official Greatest Hits compilation album by Greek recording artist Katy Garbi and 19th album overall. The album was first released as a covermount with 'Espresso' magazine on the 23 March 2013. The album was commercially released by Sony Music Greece on April 18, 2013.
Described on the front cover as "Apo Kardias / Best 2013", the album contains 36 tracks, with 34 being some of Garbi's greatest hits and the remaining 2 being new unreleased tracks. New material includes "Zontanos Ouranos" featuring accordionist Zoi Tyganouria, and radio single Pio Pano Apo Sena.

Release
In December 2012, Sony Music Greece released a new single by Garbi titled Pio Pano Apo Sena under the Front Seat imprint.  Garbi stated that the single would be one of two new tracks from an upcoming 'Best Of' compilation album to be released by Sony Music in the coming weeks.

The premiere of track "Zontanos Ouranos" featuring accordionist Zoi Tyganouria also preceded the official release of the album, as it was performed by Garbi and Tyganouria several times during their performances at Casablanca Music Hall. It was written by Tyganourgia and it was first performed as a duet between the two artists two years prior at Technopolis - Gkazi.

The album was first released on March 23, 2013 as a covermount with 'Espresso' news and entertainment magazine. The campaign distributed the double CD album throughout Greece as a bonus when purchasing the magazine, as is now common with many new releases throughout Greece. The album was commercially released by Sony Music Greece on April 18, 2013, almost one month after its covermount release, making it the 18th discographic release by Garbi under the label.

Track list

The official commercial release of the compilation album contains 38 tracks, featuring two new tracks on the second disk. The remaining album contains songs from  Katy's past studio albums except her three first uncertified works, her 1998 Christmas album Hristougenna Me Tin Katy and 2011 album Pazl which is her only album not released under the Sony Music Entertainment license, but under Universal Music Group. Although no tracks from 2008 album Kainourgia Ego are included in the commercial release, the two radio singles contained in the album are included in the covermount release with Espresso newspaper. Contrary to this, two singles from 2006 album Pos Allazei O Kairos are included in the commercial release although not included in the covermount edition.

The two-disc covermount edition released as a part of Espresso newspaper contains 34 tracks, featuring the two previously unreleased tracks on the first disk. The remaining album differs from the commercial release by omitting any tracks from 2006 album Pos Allazei O Kairos as well as several other tracks, yet including the two singles from 2008 album Kainourgia Ego. Specific to the covermount edition, the second CD contains only tracks composed by Phoebus.

Singles
The following single was officially released to radio stations.

"Pio Pano Apo Sena"
"Pio Pano Apo Esena" is the first radio single of the greatest hits album, and one of the two new tracks contained in the compilation. The release marks a return for Garbi to the laïko style of Greek commercial music, with the track being written by Vasilis Gabrilidis, lyricist Thanos Papanicolaou in a collaboration with Giannis Doxas, all notable for commercial Greek music. Garbi has previously worked with Doxas on albums such as Os Ton Paradeiso, Arhizo Polemo and most recently Emmones Idees in 2003.  It was officially released through Sony Music Greece's imprint Front Seat via the label's youtube channel on December 14, 2012. The track premiered on December 10 on Sfera Radio, during an interview with Garbi held for the station's 4th year celebration of 'Greek Music Week'. The single debuted at 72 on the Airplay Top 100 powered by Media Inspector, and has since peaked at 14.

Charts
"Apo Kardias" debuted on the Top 75 Combined album charts at number four. This is Garbi's highest debut into the Official Album Charts since 2008 album Kainourgia Ego which peaked the charts at number one. The album remained on the chart for three consecutive weeks. In July 2019, six years after its release, "Apo Kardias" re-entered the IFPI Top 75 Album Charts at 19, remaining in the top 20 for another two weeks.

Release history

References

External links
Official website

2013 albums
Greek-language albums
Katy Garbi albums